Rhododendron gracilentum is a distinctive small, evergreen rhododendron species native to Papua New Guinea.

As it does not tolerate freezing temperatures, in temperate zones it must be grown with the protection of glass.

References

 Trans. Roy. Soc. Victoria n.s., 1(2): 22 1889.
 The Plant List
 Encyclopedia of Life
 Hirsutum.com
 National Center for Biotechnology Information, U.S. National Library of Medicine

gracilentum